The undersecretary of state, in the Italian political system, is a member of the Government of Italy with the function of assisting the minister and carrying out the tasks that have been delegated to them by the minister. The undersecretary falls into the second category of the order of offices of the Italian Republic.

List

Draghi government (2021 to 2022) 

 Vincenzo Amendola (PD) – Delegated to European Affairs
 Franco Gabrielli (Ind.) – Delegated to the Authority for the Security of the Republic
 Giuseppe Moles (FI) – Delegated to Information and Publishing
 Bruno Tabacci (CD) – Delegated to the Coordination of Economic Policy and to Space
 Valentina Vezzali (Ind.) – Delegated to Sport (since 16 March 2021)
 Benedetto Della Vedova (+E) – Foreign Affairs
 Manlio Di Stefano (M5S) – Foreign Affairs
 Nicola Molteni (Lega) – Interior
 Ivan Scalfarotto (IV) – Interior
 Carlo Sibilia (M5S) – Interior
 Anna Macina (M5S) – Justice
 Francesco Paolo Sisto (FI) – Justice
 Giorgio Mulè (FI) – Defence
 Stefania Pucciarelli (Lega) – Defence
 Claudio Durigon (Lega) – Economy and Finance
 Maria Cecilia Guerra (Art.1) – Economy and Finance
 Alessandra Sartore (PD) – Economy and Finance
 Anna Ascani (PD) – Ministry of Economic Development
 Francesco Battistoni (FI) – Ministry of Agricultural, Food and Forestry Policies
 Gian Marco Centinaio (Lega) – Ministry of Agricultural, Food and Forestry Policies
 Ilaria Fontana (M5S) – Ministry of the Ecological Transition
 Vannia Gava (Lega) – Ministry of the Ecological Transition
 Giancarlo Cancelleri (M5S) – Ministry of Infrastructure and Transport
 Rossella Accoto (M5S) – Ministry of Labour and Social Policies
 Tiziana Nisini (Lega) – Ministry of Labour and Social Policies
 Barbara Floridia (M5S) – Ministry of Education, University and Research
 Rossano Sasso (Lega) – Ministry of Education, University and Research
 Lucia Borgonzoni (Lega) – Ministry of Culture
 Andrea Costa (NcI) – Ministry of Health
 Pierpaolo Sileri (M5S) – Ministry of Health
 Deborah Bergamini (FI) – Parliamentary Relations
 Simona Malpezzi (PD) – Parliamentary Relations
 Caterina Bini (PD) – Parliamentary Relations
 Dalila Nesci (M5S) – The South and Territorial Cohesion
 Assuntela Messina (PD) – Technological Innovation

Meloni government (2022 to present) 

 Alfredo Mantovano (Ind.) – Authority for the Security of the Republic
 Alessio Butti (FdI) – Technological Innovation
 Giovanbattista Fazzolari (FdI) – Implementation of the Government Program
 Alberto Barachini (FI) – Information and Publishing
 Alessandro Morelli (Lega) – Coordination of Economic Policy

 Giorgio Silli (IaC) – Foreign Affairs
 Maria Tripodi (FI) – Foreign Affairs
 Wanda Ferro (FdI) – Interior
 Nicola Molteni (Lega) – Interior
 Emanuele Prisco (FdI) – Interior

 Andrea Delmastro (FdI) – Justice
 Andrea Ostellari (Lega) – Justice
 Lucia Albano (FdI) – Economy and Finance
 Federico Freni (Lega) – Economy and Finance
 Sandra Savino (FI) – Economy and Finance

 Fausta Bergamotto (FdI) – Economic Development
 Massimo Bitonci (Lega) – Economic Development
 Luigi D'Eramo (Lega) – Agriculture
 Patrizio La Pietra (FdI) – Agriculture
 Claudio Barbaro (FdI) – Environment
 Tullio Ferrante (FI) – Infrastructure and Transport
 Claudio Durigon (Lega) – Labour and Social Policies
 Paola Frassinetti (FdI) – Education
 Augusta Montaruli (FdI) – University and Research

 Lucia Borgonzoni (Lega) – Culture
 Gianmarco Mazzi (FdI) – Culture
 Vittorio Sgarbi (Rin) – Culture
 Marcello Gemmato (FdI) – Health

 Giuseppina Castiello (Lega) – Parliamentary Relations
 Matilde Siracusano (FI) – Parliamentary Relations

References 

Politics of Italy
Italian constitutional law
Political office-holders in Italy